Zia-Allah Ezazi Maleki (Persian: ضیاءالله اعزازی ملکی) is an Iranian politician who represents Bonab in the Islamic Consultative Assembly.

See also 
 List of MPs elected in the 2016 Iranian legislative election

References 

Living people
Members of the 10th Islamic Consultative Assembly
21st-century Iranian politicians
Year of birth missing (living people)